Drew: The Man Behind the Poster is a 2013 American documentary film about the career of film poster artist Drew Struzan. It is directed by Erik Sharkey and premiered on July 19, 2013 at the San Diego Comic-Con International.

Synopsis
The documentary features interviews with a number of people, including Struzan himself, his wife, Dylan Struzan, his son, Christian Struzan, directors Steven Spielberg, Guillermo del Toro and George Lucas, and actors Harrison Ford and Michael J. Fox. The film follows Struzan's career painting movie posters for films such as Star Wars, The Thing, Back to the Future, the Indiana Jones franchise, and the Harry Potter franchise.

The film delves into Struzan's art for Alice Cooper's album Welcome to My Nightmare, and also how his artwork for Guillermo del Toro's Hellboy, Hellboy II: The Golden Army, and Pan's Labyrinth, though greatly admired by del Toro, was rejected by the studio in favor of more photographic posters. This leads the documentary in a direction about how film studios are interested more in profit rather than quality, how film posters are more often photographs of the actors rather than paintings of them.

The documentary concludes with footage of Struzan at the San Diego Comic-Con International in 2010, wherein he receives the Inkpot Award for his illustrations. This is then followed by footage of Struzan talking about and showing his personal paintings not related to film, and how he spends his time painting not for someone else, but for himself, and how he often plays outside with grandson, Nico.

Critical reception
On review aggregator Rotten Tomatoes, the film holds an approval rating of 50% based on 10 reviews, with an average rating of 5.75/10. On Metacritic, the film has a weighted average score of 59 out of 100, based on 7 critics, indicating "mixed or average reviews".

Andy Webster of The New York Times wrote that the film "becomes a mildly taxing torrent. And Mr. Struzan, while an agreeable presence, is not an especially engrossing speaker". Peter Debruge of Variety called the documentary "sophomore effort [that] is no masterpiece", although noting that he owned a Struzan poster himself and admired Struzan's "impressive oeuvre". Nick Schager of The A.V. Club appreciated that the documentary "makes a valid case for the artist as not simply an all-time great, but as a casualty of a business that prizes bottom-line cost management above unique creativity"; however, he disliked the film's focus on "lavishing adulation on Struzan".

Awards

References

External links
 
 Drew: The Man Behind The Poster at Rotten Tomatoes
 Drew: The Man Behind The Poster at Metacritic

Documentary films about visual artists
American documentary films
2013 films
Documentary films about Hollywood, Los Angeles
Films scored by Ryan Shore
2010s English-language films
2010s American films